The 1976 RAC Keith Prowse British Saloon Car Championship was the 19th season of the series. That year saw a change in the class structure, with a limit of 3000cc engines being brought in, to stop the large American V8 cars competing in the championship. Bernard Unett regained the drivers title he last won in 1974, again driving a now renamed Chrysler Avenger GT.

Classes
Cars competed in four engine capacity classes:
 Class A - 1300cc
 Class B - 1600cc
 Class C - 2000cc
 Class D - 3000cc

Calendar and winners
All races were held in the United Kingdom. Overall winners in bold.

Production cars raced alongside Class A at round 3.  John Brindley won the class.

Championship results

References

External links 
Official website of the British Touring Car Championship

British Touring Car Championship seasons
Saloon